Paolo and Francesca da Rimini is a watercolour by British artist and poet Dante Gabriel Rossetti, painted in 1855 and now in Tate Britain.

History
Rossetti's real name was Charles Gabriel Dante Rossetti, but his admiration for the great Florentine poet led him to change it to Dante Gabriel Rossetti, and he proceeded to sign all his work so. In the specific, the very subject of this painting is taken from Dante Aligheri's Inferno, Canto V – it is a small watercolour triptych executed in the archaic, medievalising style of this period in Rossetti's art, and was never painted in oil. Although the artist had been sketching the subject for many years, the watercolour took him just one week to complete. The buyer was the writer and critic John Ruskin. The drawing is simple and the colours generally muted. Only Francesca's long golden hair looks forward to the more sensuous creatures of Rossetti's later works. The picture was originally planned as a triptych in oil, with the same scenes as in the watercolour, but with the lovers kissing as the central motif.

The Triptych and the inspiring Canto
Francesca was the sister-in-law of Paolo Malatesta, and both were married, but they fell in love. Their tragic adulterous story was told by Dante in his Divine Comedy, Canto V of the Inferno, and was a popular subject with Victorian artists and sculptors, especially with followers of the Pre-Raphaelite ideology, and with other writers.

The triptych has several inscriptions taken from Canto V, with Rossetti bringing the story to life by writing relevant quotations in the original Italian around the edge of the composition. Its three parts read from left to right. The left-hand panel shows the adulterous kiss that condemns the lovers: staying faithful to Dante's poem, Rossetti depicts them reading about the Arthurian knight Sir Lancelot who also suffered for his forbidden love (his figure can be seen on the book's open page, dressed, like Paolo, in red and blue). The scene illustrates the following lines from Dante's text:

The central panel depicts two of Rossetti's literary heroes crowned with laurel: the Roman poet Virgil and the much-revered Dante himself – they regard with concern the two lovers on the right, who appear to float like wraiths in each other's arms, amid the flames of hell. Their adulterous relationship uncovered, they were murdered by Francesca's husband and Paolo's brother, Giovanni Malatesta, and banished to the second circle of hell.

In the final panel of the triptych, the lovers are being blown about violently with the wind, as described by Dante's verses:

See also
 List of paintings by Dante Gabriel Rossetti
 The Divine Comedy by Dante Alighieri
 Rossetti and His Circle by Max Beerbohm

References

Further reading
 Ash, Russell. (1995) Dante Gabriel Rossetti. London: Pavilion Books.
 Doughty, Oswald (1949) A Victorian Romantic: Dante Gabriel Rossetti  London: Frederick Muller
 Fredeman, William E. (Ed.) (2002–08) The correspondence of Dante Gabriel Rossetti. 7 Vols. Brewer, Cambridge.
 Hilto, Timoth (1970). The Pre-Raphelites. London: Thames and Hudson, New York: Abrams.
 
 Dinah Roe: The Rossettis in Wonderland. A Victorian Family History. Haus Publishing, London 2011.
 Rossetti, D. G. The House Of Life
 
 Surtees, Virginia. (1971) Dante Gabriel Rossetti. 2 vols. Oxford: Clarendon Press.
 Treuherz, Julian, Prettejohn, Elizabeth, and Becker, Edwin (2003). Dante Gabriel Rossetti. London: Thames & Hudson.
 Todd, Pamela (2001). Pre-Raphaelites at Home, New York: Watson-Giptill Publications.

External links

 Paolo and Francesca at Tate Britain
 The Rossetti Archive
 Birmingham Museums and Art Gallery's Pre-Raphaelite Online Resource
World of Dante Multimedia website that includes gallery of images of the Paolo and Francesca episode.
 Official website of Tate Britain

1850 paintings
Paintings by Dante Gabriel Rossetti
Paintings based on works by Dante Alighieri
Cultural depictions of Francesca da Rimini
Books in art
Works based on Inferno (Dante)